The Queen Anne's Bounty Act 1707 (6 Ann c 54) was an Act of the Parliament of Great Britain. It was one of the Queen Anne's Bounty Acts 1706 to 1870.

This Act is chapter XXVII of 6 Anne in common printed editions.

Sections 2 and 3 and 4 were repealed by section 1 of, and the Schedule to, the Statute Law Revision Act 1887.

The whole Act was repealed by section 6 of, and Schedule 2 to, the First Fruits and Tenths Measure 1926 (No 5).

References

Great Britain Acts of Parliament 1707